Minna Airport  is an airport  northwest of Minna, the capital of Niger State in Nigeria.

Airlines and destinations

See also
Transport in Nigeria
List of airports in Nigeria

References

External links
OurAirports - Minna
SkyVector Aeronautical Charts

Airports in Nigeria
Niger State